Mets Shen or Boyuk Galadarasi is a village de facto in the Shushi Province of the breakaway Republic of Artsakh, de jure in the Shusha District of Azerbaijan, in the disputed region of Nagorno-Karabakh. The village has an ethnic Armenian-majority population, and also had an Armenian majority in 1989.

Toponymy 
The village was known as Metskaladeresi during the Soviet period.

History 
During the Soviet period, the village was a part of the Shusha District of the Nagorno-Karabakh Autonomous Oblast.

Historical heritage sites 
Historical heritage sites in and around the village include the church of Parin Pizh built in 1658, and the 19th-century church of Surb Astvatsatsin.

Economy and culture 
The population is mainly engaged in agriculture and animal husbandry. As of 2015, the village has a municipal building, a house of culture, a secondary school, and a medical centre.

Demographics 
The village had 92 inhabitants in 2005, and 116 inhabitants in 2015.

Gallery

References

External links 

 

Populated places in Shushi Province
Populated places in Shusha District